13000 series may refer to the Japanese trains:
 Keihan 13000 series
 Tokyo Metro 13000 series